Across the Pathways of Space (Par les Chemins de l'Espace) is a collection of short stories in the French comic book (or bande dessinée) science fiction series Valérian and Laureline created by writer Pierre Christin and artist Jean-Claude Mézières. They first appeared in Super Pocket Pilote, a quarterly, digest-sized offshoot of Pilote magazine, between 1969 and 1970.

The stories

The Great Collector (Le Grand Collectionneur)
First published in Super Pocket Pilote, Issue 3 (3 April 1969)

Valérian is returning from a mission in the Arcturus system when his astroship malfunctions and comes to a dead stop. Spacewalking outside the ship in an attempt to make repairs, he finds an Arcturian floating outside in space. The Arcturian tells him his ship is caught in a magnetic trap and is falling towards a nearby asteroid. He tells Valérian to bring his magnetic field generator with him when next they meet and then he falls away towards the asteroid. Sure enough, as the Arcturian told him, Valérian's ship crashes on the asteroid in a graveyard of spaceships. Going in search of the cause of his problems, he comes upon what looks like a labyrinth. Exploring, he finds a cage containing two bird-men from Deneb. They tell him that they have been captured by the Great Collector and are part of his menagerie. Searching for the Arcturians, he meets more captive aliens and finally finds the Arcturian who now looks old and wizened. The Arcturian tells Valérian that what he saw outside his ship was just a projection of his mind. He goes on to say that he believes he can reverse the magnetic field that draws spaceships to the planet and keeps the cages locked using the magnetic field generator Valérian has brought although the process will kill him. Reluctantly, Valérian connects the Arcturian to the device and his body lights up. The magnetic field is deactivated and the specimens flee their cages. They are pursued by the Great Collector – a giant spider-like creature – who manages to kill some of his prey but most manage to get to their ships and blast-off. Valérian, at last, manages to get to his ship as well from which he broadcasts a message warning all from approaching the asteroid and the Great Collector.

The Fflumgluff of Friendship (Le Fflumgluff de l'Amitie)
 First published in Super Pocket Pilote, Issue 8 (25 June 1970)

Valérian is waiting at one of the Spatio-Temporal Service's bases for his colleague Slane to arrive. His ship appears but fails to slow down and crashes to the ground narrowly missing Valérian. The hull bursts apart and great tentacles of vegetation spew forth. Valérian tries to clear them away with his laser cannon but the creature absorbs the energy and grows bigger. As the tentacles spread towards his ship Valérian takes off to escape being overwhelmed. Activating his spatio-temporal engines he jumps back in time a few hours in a bid to find what happened. Rendezvousing with Slane's ship he enters and finds Slane unconscious at the controls, the vegetable tentacles growing out of his stomach. Realizing he is too late, he returns to his ship and jumps back another few hours. This time Slane is conscious and Valérian relaxes thinking he has arrived in time. Then Slane starts complaining of a stomach ache – he ate a meal with the indigenous natives on the planet Malvis while he was there yesterday. Realizing that this must be the source of the problem, Valérian demands that Slane give him the co-ordinates of Malvis. Jumping back further in time again, Valérian arrives on Malvis just as Slane is landing. Before Valérian can explain what he is doing here, the natives arrive. Slane closes a trade deal with the natives and the two Terrans are invited to attend a festival in their honour. Gathered for the meal, the Malvisian chieftain offers them a bowl of their favourite dish, the living plant, fflumgluff. As Slane reaches to takes some, Valérian snatches it away – it is the same vegetation he saw earlier – and tells Slane not to eat it. Before he can explain, the Malvisians take offence at the refusal to eat the meal they have laid on and turn nasty. Valérian and Slane are forced to flee to their astroships. Meeting up again later at the base, Valérian has a lot of explaining to do to an enraged Slane.

Tsirillitis the Asteroid (Tsirillitis l'Asteroide)
 First published in Super Pocket Pilote, Issue 5 (23 October 1969)

Valérian's astroship is on a bizarre asteroid with strange cones the only interruption to the oddly smooth ground. Inside the ship, Valérian lies unconscious. Another astroship lands beside Valérian's and Laureline emerges. She rushes into Valérian's ship and forces him to drink the antidote she has brought. Valérian had been exploring the asteroid when he was stung by a jellyfish-like creature. He managed to radio back enough information to Galaxity for them to make an antidote which Laureline delivered. Laureline wants to leave but Valérian wants to complete his exploration of the asteroid. he climbs up to the top of one of the cones ton find the asteroid is in fact a hollow shell. Some more jellyfish rise out of the cone and drag Valérian inside. He is absorbed a large cellular structure resembling a giant bacteria and deposited at the centre of the asteroid which is alive – it introduces itself as Tsirillitis and tells Valérian that he has been disturbing its biological functions. Valérian will be crushed and his remains used to nourish Tsirillitis. Meanwhile, Laureline follows Valérian's path and, although she does her best to resist, soon winds up like Valérian on the way to the crusher to feed Tsirillitis. Suddenly Laureline has an idea – she tells Valérian to throw the last of the antidote into the crusher. Tsirillitis reacts violently to the drug and spews Valérian and Laureline back out onto the surface who get back in their ships and leave. Back at Galaxity, Valérian recounts the tale but Laureline is concerned that they have killed an innocent lifeform. Valérian tells her not to worry – Tsirillitis is fine, but he won't be eating any more Terrans in a hurry.

The Cogs of Uxgloa (Les Engrenages d'Uxgloa)
 First published in Super Pocket Pilote, Issue 4 (12 June 1969)

Valérian is on a mission to explore the planet Uxgloa. Landing, Valérian quickly realises that he has inadvertently landed in the middle of a battlefield. He is amazed to notice that all of the men in each army are identical to each other. Retreating back to his astroship, he is struck on the head by a stone and falls unconscious through the entrance. The leader of one of the armies, named Urs, follows him and he in turn is followed by the leader of the other army, Kline. They fight and Urs manages to kill Kline. Valérian comes round and is horrified to discover that his astroship has been wrecked beyond repair by the fight. He is stranded on Uxgloa. Urs offers to help Valérian. As they pass the field of battle, Valérian notices that the only bodies are those of Urs' men. Urs tells him that the soldiers are just illusions and pressing a button on a device he is wearing, all of his men disappear. Arriving at Urs' fortress, he explains that he was born in an automatic incubator and his purpose is to fight the other lords of Uxgloa. Valérian asks Urs if his race ever travelled to the stars. Urs tells him that it is said that in the Northern Desert there exists remains of what were called "Star Gates". He then shows Valérian where his armies come from – a huge machine in the bowels of the fortress that creates images of whoever steps inside – sometimes older, sometime younger. But there is a price – for each image that is killed on the battlefield, the original must sleep for one day. Valérian steps into the machine and two images of him are produced – one of him as a boy and one as an old man. The three Valérians leave Urs and make for the Northern Desert. After many days of searching they at last find the Star Gate, a vast celestial sphere lying in a black lake. The older Valérian reveals that the letters inscribed on the device resemble those seen on Earth in Tibet. Eventually, Valérian finds a representation of the Solar System on the sphere and the younger Valérian finds out how to activate the mechanism. Valérian disappears into the Star Gate leaving the older and younger Valérians to live out the remainder of their lives on Uxgloa. Valérian lands back on Earth in a lake and heads off in search of civilisation, wondering how he's going to be able to explain what happened to Galaxity.

The Sad Planet (La Planete Triste)
 First published in Super Pocket Pilote, Issue 6 (25 December 1969)

Valérian is dispatched by Galaxity on reconnaissance to the planet Flammil which is surrounded by a dense asteroid belt. Making his may through the belt, Valérian's astroship becomes entangled in vegetation. While working outside the ship trying to free it he spots a female humanoid figure. Pursuing her, she flees but runs into trouble and ends up dangling on a creeper. Valérian rescues her and she takes him to her village. The village is populated by female huntresses like the one Valérian chased. Valérian asks for help freeing his ship and two of them lead him to a path through the asteroids. Following the path, he comes to an asteroid populated by old men chained to the tops of pillars of rock. Communicating telepathically, they tell Valérian that they are atoning for the sins of Falmmil and that huntresses bring them food and protect them. They tell Valérian that he will find help if he goes to the three moons. Continuing along the pathways through the asteroids he comes to the three moons which have been bolted together with metal struts. The population are poor and malnourished and tend thinly cultivated fields. Reaching a building on one of the moons, Valérian meets with the elders. They explain that Flammil itself is no longer habitable having been sterilised with radioactivity following a war. The survivors are struggling to exist in the asteroid belt trying to preserve their history and culture. Valérian is sympathetic and tells him that Earth had to overcome a similar situation once (a reference to the catastrophe of 1986 seen in The City of Shifting Waters). He offers Earth's assistance in return for help in releasing his astroship. Later, his astroship freed, he organises a decontamination expedition from Earth to visit Flammil.

Triumph of Technology (Triomphe de la Technique)
 First published in Super Pocket Pilote, Issue 9 (29 October 1970)

Galaxity plan to erect a communications relay on the planet Lanning. Unfortunately, the natives, although friendly, are very primitive and may be disturbed by the presence of such a large mechanism on their land. Valérian is sent to try to familiarise them with Galaxity's high technology in the hope that they will then accept the relay. Arriving at Lanning, the natives hold a feast in Valérian's honour. After the feast, Valérian offers to show them some of Galaxity's technology. He demonstrates a dream projector. The natives are unimpressed and ask Valérian to think of someone he likes. Suddenly, Valérian has a very vivid dream about Laureline far superior to anything the projector can offer. Realizing that the projector won't impress them, he demonstrates his all-terrain vehicle. The native chief complains about the bumpy ride but Valérian responds that it's a faster way of getting around. Suddenly, from a standing start, the rest of the natives overtake the vehicle on foot, barely breaking a sweat. Exasperated, Valérian tries another tack and straps on a jet pack, flying into the air. However, the Lannings have another trick up their sleeve – they can fly! To add insult to injury, Valérian's jet pack breaks down and he has to be rescued by the Lannings. The Lannings are finding this very amusing and ask Valérian to show them another machine. He demonstrates a personal shield – the chief puts one on and Valérian throws rocks at him showing that they bounce off the shield. Then one of the other natives steps forward and bursts the shield just by flicking it with his finger. Valérian then gives up and returns to the camp dejected. The natives ask what's wrong and he explains that he was to demonstrate his technology so they would accept the communications relay. He shows them a model of the relay and the Lannings are so impressed with how pretty it looks they immediately agree that it can be built on their land. Valérian returns to Galaxity and tries not to laugh when his superiors congratulate him on showing the Lannings the triumph of Galaxity's technology.

Funny Specimens (Droles de Specimens)
 First published in Super Pocket Pilote, Issue 7 (19 March 1970)

Valérian, accompanied by Laureline and two technocrats from Galaxity – Myril, a biochemist and Astair, a mathematician – has set up a laboratory at the pole of the planet Malpalm. The pole marks the meeting point between four spatio-temporal faults that form four discrete zones on the planet. In Zone A, time moves very quickly and lifeforms age rapidly there. In Zone B, time moves in reverse. In Zone C, everything continually shrinks in size. And in Zone D, everything continually grows in size. Astair has calculated that humans can survive in each zone for 12 minutes before they are affected by the conditions there. The mission is to bring back samples from each of the Zones for analysis. The first expeditions will be to Zones A and C and will be conducted by Myril and Astair respectively while Valérian and Laureline monitor their progress. Myril enters Zone A to bring back some birds and Astair enters Zone C to bring back some dragonflies. After 10 minutes, Laureline warns both of them to start making their way back but there is no answer from either. Valérian heads into Zone A to rescue Myril. Reaching the spot where Myril was last seen, he discovers that Myril had inadvertently got trapped in the cage he was meant to put his specimen in and has aged to death. Valérian returns to the lab with Myril's body. But he has an idea – he gets Laureline to take the body to Zone B to see if the backwards flow of time there brings him round. Then he enters Zone C in search of Astair. He finds Astair who has been shrunk to the size of a flea. By the time he gets him back to the lab, Valérian needs a microscope to see him. He brings him to Zone D where slowly Astair grows back to his normal size. Suddenly they are attacked by one of the giant sequoia eaters that live in the Zone who blocks the entrance to the lab. Using his gun, Valérian makes the animal flee but his exposure to the zone has been too long and he has grown so tall that he has difficulty squeezing through the lab's doors. Once inside, he realises that Laureline has been gone too long. Searching Zone B, he is horrified to find that while Myril has come back to life, he is now only a boy and Laureline is now a baby. Taking them both back to the lab, Valérian tries to keep order while Astair tries to calculate how long each of them needs to spend in each zone to get back to normal. Galaxity calls looking for a progress report and Valérian tells them they have had some technical difficulties.

Notes
 Shy of two stories, the collection was first published as an album release in 1979, whereas a complete collection album followed in 1997. No official English translation exists as of 2019 – the efforts of UK publisher Cinebook notwithstanding, which has published all other Valérian and Laureline albums in English – , but it has seen translations in several other languages, among others in Dutch.
 The order in which the stories were published in Super Pocket Pilote is different from the order that they appear in this collection. The correct chronological order should be:
 The Great Collector
 The Cogs of Uxgloa
 Tsirillitis the Asteroid
 The Sad Planet
 Funny Specimens
 The Fflumgluff of Friendship
 Triumph of Technology
 Laureline appears in person in only two of the stories, Tsirillitis the Asteroid and Funny Specimens, and makes a cameo in Valérian's dream in Triumph of Technology.
 It is not clear exactly where in the Valérian canon these stories fit – their original publication would have been concurrent with the serialisations of The City of Shifting Waters, Empire of a Thousand Planets and World Without Stars in Pilote. The chronology published with Bad Dreams and In Uncertain Times puts these stories as occurring prior to Welcome to Alflolol. 
 The story "The Great Collector" features the first appearance in print of Valérian's saucer-shaped astroship.

References

Valérian and Laureline